Lee Su-Hwan (born January 26, 1983), often anglicised  to Su-Hwan Lee, is a South Korean middleweight kickboxer currently fighting out of Khan Gym in Seoul. He is the K-1 Fighting Network KHAN 2007 in Seoul champion currently fighting in K-1 MAX and Shoot boxing.

Biography and career 

Su Hwan Lee made his K-1 MAX debut against Remigijus Morkevičius in 2005 at K-1 Fighting Network Korea MAX 2005. Su Hwan Lee came into this fight holding a number of local honours such as being the reigning MBC ESPN Young-Ji Medicine Cup champion but found Morkevičius a higher level of opponent than what he was used to - losing by knockout in the second round.  Lee would return to action the following year at the K-1 Fighting Network KHAN 2006 in Busan where he would reach the final, losing to Chi Bin Lim by technical knockout and missing out at a place at the K-1 World MAX 2006 World Tournament Open. He would finish the year strongly, winning two Super Fights and go 4 and 1 for 2006.

2007 would be a successful year for Lee. He won the K-1 Fighting Network KHAN 2007 in Seoul tournament gaining revenge on Chi Bin Lim and qualified for the K-1 World MAX 2007 Final Elimination. Lee faced Artur Kyshenko at this event but lost by knockout. His performance, however, earned him a Super Fight place at the K-1 World MAX 2007 World Final. Lee would win this fight and finish 2007 with a 3 and 1 record.  Su Hwan Lee had a disappointing 2008 - he could only make the semi finals at the K-1 Asia MAX 2008 in Seoul Asia Tournament losing to K. MAX by majority decision. He had one other fight that year - a win - and finished with a 2 and 1 record.

In 2009 Lee managed to reach the final of the K-1 Award & MAX Korea 2009 event, losing to nemesis Chi Bin Lim by knockout. Despite his loss, Lee would be invited to the K-1 World MAX 2009 Final 16 as a reservist. He would lose this fight and taking into consideration Super Fight results (a loss against Albert Kraus and an excellent win against Xan Yu) would finish 2009 with a 3 and 3 record.  In 2010 Lee won two fights against Japanese opposition prior to being invited to the K-1 World MAX 2010 Final 16 - Part 2 for a chance of qualifying for that year's final.  He was unable to proceed after being knocked out in devastating fashion by popular K-1 MAX veteran Gago Drago.

On December 17, 2012, Lee faced Danilo Zanolini for the HEAT Middleweight (-70 kg) Championship but was knocked out in the second round.

Titles 
2009 K-1 Award & Max Korea runner up
2007 K-1 Fighting Network KHAN in Seoul champion
2006 K-1 Fighting Network KHAN in Busan runner up
2005 MBC ESPN Young-Ji Medicine Cup 70 kg champion
2003 Korea Middleweight champion
2002 Korea Grand Prix 65 kg champion
2001 Korea Junior Welterweight champion

Kickboxing record 

|-  bgcolor="#FFBBBB"
| 2012-05-27 || Loss ||align=left| Artur Kyshenko || K-1 World MAX 2012 World Championship Tournament Final 16 || Madrid, Spain || KO (Left hook) || 2 || 2:05 || 16-11
|-
|-  bgcolor="#FFBBBB"
| 2012-01-15 || Loss ||align=left| Woo Yong Choi || The Khan 3 || Seoul, South Korea || Decision || 3 || 3:00 || 16-10
|-
|-  bgcolor="#FFBBBB"
| 2011-12-17 || Loss ||align=left| Danilo Zanolini || HEAT 20 || Tokyo, Japan || KO || 2 || 2:37 || 16-9
|-
! style=background:white colspan=9 |
|-
|-  bgcolor="#CCFFCC"
| 2011-01-15 || Win ||align=left| Yang Zhuo || Wu Lin Feng  || Henan, China || Decision || 3 || 3:00 || 16-8
|-
|-  bgcolor="#FFBBBB"
| 2010-10-03 || Loss ||align=left| Gago Drago || K-1 World MAX 2010 Final 16 - Part 2 || Seoul, South Korea || KO (Right High Kick) || 2 || 2:52 || 15-8 
|-
! style=background:white colspan=9 |
|-
|-  bgcolor="#CCFFCC"
| 2010-05-16 || Win ||align=left| Yukihiro Komiya || RISE 65 || Tokyo, Japan || Ext.R Decision (Unanimous) || 4 || 3:00 || 15-7
|-  bgcolor="#CCFFCC"
| 2010-04-11 || Win ||align=left| Kenji Kanai || Shoot Boxing 25th Anniversary - Ishin 2nd Battle || Tokyo, Japan || TKO || 1 || 0:38 || 14-7
|-
|-  bgcolor="#CCFFCC"
| 2009-11-27 || Win ||align=left| Xu Yan || The Khan 2 || Seoul, South Korea || TKO (Left Straight) || 2 || 2:10 || 13-7 
|-
|-  bgcolor="#FFBBBB"
| 2009-04-21 || Loss ||align=left| Yasuhiro Kido || K-1 World MAX 2009 Final 16, Reserve Fight || Fukuoka, Japan || Decision (Unanimous) || 3 || 3:00 || 12-7
|-
|-  bgcolor="#FFBBBB"
| 2009-03-20 || Loss ||align=left| Chi Bin Lim || K-1 Award & MAX Korea 2009 Final || Seoul, South Korea || KO || 3 || 1:50 || 12-6
|-
! style=background:white colspan=9 |
|-
|-  bgcolor="#CCFFCC"
| 2009-03-20 || Win ||align=left| Jae Gil No || K-1 Award & MAX Korea 2009 Semi Finals || Seoul, South Korea || KO || 1 || 1:30 || 12-5
|-
|-  bgcolor="#CCFFCC"
| 2009-03-20 || Win ||align=left| Munguntsooj Nandin-Erdene || K-1 Award & MAX Korea 2009 Quarter Finals || Seoul, South Korea || KO || 1 || 1:25 || 11-5
|-
|-  bgcolor="#FFBBBB"
| 2009-02-23 || Loss ||align=left| Albert Kraus || K-1 World MAX 2009 Japan Tournament || Tokyo, Japan || Decision (Unanimous) || 3 || 3:00 || 10-5
|-
|-  bgcolor="#CCFFCC"
| 2008-11-08 || Win ||align=left| Keiji Ozaki || AJKF "Krush! -Kickboxing Destruction-" || Tokyo, Japan || Ext.R Decision (Split) || 4 || 3:00 || 10-4
|-
|-  bgcolor="#FFBBBB"
| 2008-02-24 || Loss ||align=left| K. MAX || K-1 Asia MAX 2008 in Seoul Asia Tournament Semi Finals || Seoul, South Korea || Decision (Majority) || 3 || 3:00 || 9-4
|-
|-  bgcolor="#CCFFCC"
| 2008-02-24 || Win ||align=left| Sirimongkol Singwangcha || K-1 Asia MAX 2008 in Seoul Asia Tournament Quarter Finals || Seoul, South Korea || Ext.R Decision (Split) || 4 || 3:00 || 9-3
|-
|-  bgcolor="#CCFFCC"
| 2007-10-03 || Win ||align=left| Kazuya Yasuhiro || K-1 World MAX 2007 World Championship Final || Tokyo, Japan || Decision (Unanimous) || 3 || 3:00 || 8-3
|-
|-  bgcolor="#FFBBBB"
| 2007-06-28 || Loss ||align=left| Artur Kyshenko || K-1 World MAX 2007 World Tournament Final Elimination || Tokyo, Japan || KO (Left Hook) || 3 || 1:26 || 7-3
|-
! style=background:white colspan=9 |
|-
|-  bgcolor="#CCFFCC"
| 2007-02-18 || Win ||align=left| Chi Bin Lim || K-1 Fighting Network KHAN 2007 in Seoul Final || Seoul, South Korea || KO || 1 || 1:50 || 7-2
|-
! style=background:white colspan=9 |
|-
|-  bgcolor="#CCFFCC"
| 2007-02-18 || Win ||align=left| Jin Hwan Lee || K-1 Fighting Network KHAN 2007 in Seoul Semi Final || Seoul, South Korea || Decision (Majority) || 3 || 3:00 || 6-2 
|-
|-  bgcolor="#CCFFCC"
| 2007-02-18 || Win ||align=left| Sung Hoon Kim || K-1 Fighting Network KHAN 2007 in Seoul Quarter Final || Seoul, South Korea || KO || 1 || 0:30 || 5-2
|-
|-  bgcolor="#CCFFCC"
| 2006-10-14 || Win ||align=left| Juante Steyn || K-1 Rules Africa Bomba-Yaa 2006 || Johannesburg, South Africa || Decision (Unanimous) || 3 || 3:00 || 4-2
|-
|-  bgcolor="#CCFFCC"
| 2006-09-16 || Win ||align=left| Shingo Garyu || K-1 Fighting Network KHAN 2006 in Seoul || Seoul, South Korea || TKO || 1 || 0:27 || 3-2
|-
|-  bgcolor="#FFBBBB"
| 2006-02-25 || Loss ||align=left| Chi Bin Lim || K-1 Fighting Network KHAN 2006 in Busan Final || Busan, South Korea || TKO || 3 || 1:30 || 2-2
|-
! style=background:white colspan=9 |
|-
|-  bgcolor="#CCFFCC"
| 2006-02-25 || Win ||align=left| Jung Woong Moon || K-1 Fighting Network KHAN 2006 in Busan Semi Final || Busan, South Korea || TKO || 1 || 1:53 || 2-1
|-
|-  bgcolor="#CCFFCC"
| 2006-02-25 || Win ||align=left| Jae Sik Choi || K-1 Fighting Network KHAN 2006 in Busan Quarter Final || Busan, South Korea || KO || 1 || 0:24 || 1-1
|-
|-  bgcolor="#FFBBBB"
| 2005-11-05 || Loss ||align=left| Remigijus Morkevičius || K-1 Fighting Network Korea MAX 2005 || Seoul, South Korea || KO || 2 || 2:50 || 0-1 
|-
|-
| colspan=9 | Legend:

See also 
List of male kickboxers
List of K-1 Events

External links
K-1.de - Your Source for Everything K-1 - Su Hwan Lee fighter's profile

References

Living people
1983 births
South Korean male kickboxers
Welterweight kickboxers
Middleweight kickboxers
Sportspeople from Seoul